The 2021 Andy's Frozen Custard 335 was a NASCAR Xfinity Series race that was held on October 16, 2021, at the Texas Motor Speedway in Fort Worth, Texas. Contested over 200 laps on the  oval, it was the 30th race of the 2021 NASCAR Xfinity Series season, the fourth race of the Playoffs, and the first race of the Round of 8. Joe Gibbs Racing driver John Hunter Nemechek  collected his first win of the season, and the second of his career.

Report

Background 
Texas Motor Speedway is a speedway located in the northernmost portion of the U.S. city of Fort Worth, Texas – the portion located in Denton County, Texas. The track measures 1.5 miles (2.4 km) around and is banked 24 degrees in the turns, and is of the oval design, where the front straightaway juts outward slightly. The track layout is similar to Atlanta Motor Speedway and Charlotte Motor Speedway (formerly Lowe's Motor Speedway). The track is owned by Speedway Motorsports, Inc., the same company that owns Atlanta and Charlotte Motor Speedways, as well as the short-track Bristol Motor Speedway.

Entry list 

 (R) denotes rookie driver.
 (i) denotes driver who is ineligible for series driver points.

Qualifying
A. J. Allmendinger was awarded the pole for the race as determined by competition-based formula. Timmy Hill did not have enough points to qualify for the race.

Starting Lineups

Race

Race results

Stage Results 
Stage One
Laps: 50

Stage Two
Laps: 50

Final Stage Results 

Laps: 100

Race statistics 

 Lead changes: 8 among 5 different drivers
 Cautions/Laps: 10 for 54
 Time of race: 2 hours, 35 minutes, and 48 seconds
 Average speed:

References 

NASCAR races at Texas Motor Speedway
2021 in sports in Texas
Andy's Frozen Custard 335
2021 NASCAR Xfinity Series